Liyanagoda is a small town in Sri Lanka. It is located within the Southern Province of Sri Lanka, in the suburb of Pannipitiya.

See also
List of towns in Southern Province, Sri Lanka

External links

Populated places in Southern Province, Sri Lanka